Sixth Army is a theater army of the United States Army. The Army service component command of United States Southern Command, its area of responsibility includes 31 countries and 15 areas of special sovereignty in Central and South America and the Caribbean.  It is headquartered at Fort Sam Houston.

The Sixth Army saw extensive service in the South Pacific during World War II, including in New Britain, New Guinea, and the Philippines.  Postwar it served stateside training army forces until its inactivation during force reduction in 1995.  The army was reactivated in 2007.

History
The Sixth United States Army was activated in January 1943, commanded by Lieutenant General Walter Krueger. Under the code name Alamo Force, it assumed control of the majority of US Army units involved in Operation Cartwheel, the campaign to isolate and neutralize the Japanese base at Rabaul in New Britain. Following the completion of Cartwheel, Sixth Army joined the Australian Army and other US forces on the north coast of New Guinea. Similar in conception to the island hopping operations of the central Pacific, the object of the attacks was to land, establish a garrison and airfield which could support the next strike, and then move on.

In September 1944, Sixth Army was relieved from operations in New Guinea by the Eighth United States Army. On 20 October 1944, X Corps and XXIV Corps, under Sixth Army, invaded Leyte in the Philippines. By December, Leyte was secured, and the Sixth Army was relieved again by Eighth Army to prepare for the invasion of Luzon. As a prelude to that invasion, the island of Mindoro was invaded by the Western Visayan Task Force comprising the 19th and 503rd Regimental Combat Teams. Sixth Army took part in the Invasion of Lingayen Gulf on 9 January 1945 with the subordinate units of I and XIV Corps. Sixth Army units fought south until they met up those of Eighth Army advancing from around Manila. Sixth Army then continued to clear the north of Luzon until the end of the war. Sixth Army was to have provided the ground forces for the first phase of the invasion of Japan, though after Japan's early surrender Sixth Army was reassigned to occupation duty in Japan. Sixth Army returned to the United States in 1946, and was headquartered at the Presidio of San Francisco. 

After the war, Sixth Army took responsibility for training of Army forces from part of the continental United States. It was eventually inactivated in June 1995 due to force reductions.

Reactivation
In 2007 it was decided that US Army South would be redesignated as US Army South (Sixth Army) under the Army modularization program. It is garrisoned at the Old Brooke Army Medical Center building at Fort Sam Houston.

Organization of the army after reformation is as follows:

 United States Army South Headquarters and Headquarters Battalion, Fort Sam Houston, Texas
 470th Military Intelligence Brigade, Fort Sam Houston, Texas
 56th Signal Battalion, Fort Sam Houston, Texas
 Army Forces, Honduras (Joint Task Force Bravo), Soto Cano Air Base, Honduras
 Geospatial Planning Cell, 512th Engineer Detachment, Fort Sam Houston, Texas
 377th Theater Sustainment Command, New Orleans, Louisiana
 807th Deployment Support Medical Command, Fort Douglas, Utah
 525th Military Police Battalion, Guantanamo Bay, Cuba
 1st Battalion, 228th Aviation Regiment, Soto Cano Air Base, Honduras

Commanding officers
GEN Walter Krueger (16 February 1943 – 28 January 1946)
Inactive (29 January 1946 – 28 February 1946)
GEN Joseph W. Stilwell (1 March 1946 – 12 October 1946)
MG George Price Hays (13 October 1946 - June 1947)
GEN Mark W. Clark (June 1947 - 30 September 1949)
LTG Albert C. Wedemeyer (1 October 1949 – 31 July 1951)
LTG Joseph M. Swing (1951–1954)
LTG Willard G. Wyman (1954–1955)
LTG Robert N. Young (1955–1957)
LTG Lemuel Mathewson (1957–1958)
LTG Charles D. Palmer (1958 – 31 August 1959)
LTG Robert M. Cannon (1 September 1959 – 31 August 1961)
LTG John L. Ryan (1 September 1961 – 31 July 1963)
LTG Frederic J. Brown II (1 August 1963 – 31 July 1965)
LTG James L. Richardson (1 August 1965 – 1967)
LTG Ben Harrell (1967–1968)
LTG Stanley R. Larsen (1968–1971)
LTG Alexander D. Surles (1971–1972)
LTG Richard G. Stilwell (1972–1973)
LTG Elvy B. Roberts (1973–1975)
LTG Edward M. Flanagan Jr. (1975–1978)
LTG Eugene Forrester (1978–1980)
LTG Charles M. Hall (1980–1981)
LTG David E. Grange Jr. (1981–1984)
LTG Robert Arter (1984–1986)
LTG Frederick F. Woerner Jr. (1986–1987)
LTG James E. Moore Jr. (1987–1989)
LTG William H. Harrison (1989–1991)
LTG Glynn C. Mallory Jr. (1991–1995)

References

External links
 List of former commanders of 6th United States Army and United States Army South at United States Army South website
 Sixth U.S. Army
 Fort Ord California
 Born of War ... Dedicated to Peace
 
 

006 Army
Military units and formations established in 1943